"Being with You" is a 1981 song recorded by American singer Smokey Robinson and is the title track from his Gold-certified album with the same name. The song spent five weeks at No. 1 on the Hot Soul Singles chart from March to early May 1981 and reached number two on the Billboard Hot 100, behind "Bette Davis Eyes" by Kim Carnes, his highest charting solo hit on the Billboard pop charts. It also reached number one in the UK Singles Chart.  It hit No. 1 on the US Cash Box Top 100. The track was also a No. 1 hit in the UK Singles Chart in June 1981, becoming Robinson's second UK No. 1 single and his first as a solo artist.

Very soon after Robinson's English single was released, Motown's subsidiary label Tamla released a Spanish version of the song under the title of "Aqui Con Tigo" (Tamla T 54325F), backed with a bilingual English/Spanish version.

Chart performance

Weekly charts

Year-end charts

All-time charts

References

Smokey Robinson songs
1981 songs
1981 singles
Songs written by Smokey Robinson
Cashbox number-one singles
UK Singles Chart number-one singles
Motown singles
Number-one singles in New Zealand